Margown (also Romanized as Mārgown and Māregūn; also known as Mārjān and Mārkān) is a city in and the capital of Margown County in Kohgiluyeh and Boyer-Ahmad Province, Iran. At the 2006 census, its population was 2,538, in 497 families.

References

Populated places in Margown County
Cities in Kohgiluyeh and Boyer-Ahmad Province